Chthonius tetrachelatus is a species of pseudoscorpions in the family Chthoniidae.

References

External links

 NCBI Taxonomy Browser, Chthonius tetrachelatus

Chthoniidae